The General Benjamin Lincoln House is a National Historic Landmark at 181 North Street in Hingham, Massachusetts, United States.  It was the birthplace and principal residence of Continental Army Major General Benjamin Lincoln (1733–1810), a well-respected military leader of the American Revolutionary War.  The house has portions that are said to date to the 1630s, with significant additions made principally during the 18th century, possibly making it one of the nation's oldest wood-frame buildings.  The last major modifications to the house were probably undertaken by General Lincoln in the late 18th century.

The house had remained in the hands of Lincoln family descendants but was listed for sale in 2020.  Changes to the interior and exterior are authorized only in consultation with Historic New England, a major regional historic preservation organization.

History of the house

Like many early American houses, the Benjamin Lincoln House has gone through a number of phases, and the dates of work on the house are at times uncertain.  Family history places the initial construction of part of the house as early as 1637, by Thomas Lincoln "the cooper" (so designated to differentiate him from numerous other Thomas Lincolns who also settled in Hingham), although there is no visible architectural evidence to support this assertion.  What is certain is that circa 1715 the house acquired an L-shaped appearance, and was expanded by General Lincoln in the late 18th century to its present configuration.  A porch that was added in the late 19th century was removed in 1937, and represents the only significant alteration to the house since General Lincoln's time.

In 2009 Lincoln family descendants negotiated a preservation restriction agreement with Historic New England, a regional historic preservation society, to protect the interior and exterior character of the house.  Exterior changes to the property are also restricted by the house's presence as a contributing property to Hingham's Lincoln Historic District.

Description
The Lincoln House stands a short way west of Hingham's central business district, just west of a triangular park formed at the junction of North and Lincoln Streets.  It is a -story wood-frame structure, seven bays wide, with a side-gable roof, two interior chimneys, and clapboard siding, and rests on a granite foundation.  Its main entrance is in the center of the south-facing facade, topped by a simple flat corniced pediment.  The entrance opens into a central hall with stairs to the second floor.  To its right are the main parlor in the front, with two smaller rooms behind, traditionally described as its 1637 kitchen and borning room.  These rooms have paneled walls around the fireplaces, with that in the parlor decorated with blue Delft tile.  To the left of the central hall is the former entry vestibule, with a winding staircase, and the 1715 dining room, also with a fully paneled fireplace wall.  The house's 1715 kitchen is behind this room.  There are a total of seven staircases, and there are seven bedrooms on the second floor.

Benjamin Lincoln

Benjamin Lincoln was born in the house in 1733.  He was active in local politics, and held positions of leadership in the militia of the Province of Massachusetts Bay.  He became a major general in the Continental Army during the American Revolutionary War, in which he surrendered American forces at the Siege of Charleston in 1780, and was present at the British surrender at Yorktown in 1781.

General Lincoln then served as Secretary at War before returning to Massachusetts in 1783.  He was then active in Massachusetts politics and military, leading militia that suppressed Shays' Rebellion in 1787, and served one term as lieutenant governor in 1788.  He was for many years thereafter the federal collector at the Port of Boston.

See also
List of National Historic Landmarks in Massachusetts
National Register of Historic Places listings in Plymouth County, Massachusetts

Notes

Houses completed in 1715
National Historic Landmarks in Massachusetts
Houses in Hingham, Massachusetts
National Register of Historic Places in Plymouth County, Massachusetts
Historic district contributing properties in Massachusetts
Houses on the National Register of Historic Places in Plymouth County, Massachusetts
1715 establishments in Massachusetts